Mīrāb is a sub-district located in the Maqbanah District, Taiz Governorate, Yemen. Mīrāb had a population of 14,411 according to the 2004 census.

Climate 
Mīrāb has hot deserts climate.

References 

Sub-districts in Maqbanah District